Mugdha Veira Godse  is an Indian actress and model who appears in Hindi films. A former model, Godse was a semi-finalist at the Femina Miss India 2004 competition. She made her acting debut in Madhur Bhandarkar's 2008 film, Fashion. She was one of the judges in a Marathi reality show, Marathi Paul Padte Pudhe. She also acted in Tamil film Thani Oruvan.

Early life and modeling career

Godse was born in 1986 in a small middle-class family in Pune. She did her schooling from Nutan Marathi Vidyalaya, Pune. Godse completed her Bachelor of Commerce degree from Marathwada Mitra Mandal College of Commerce in Pune. During her early days, Godse sold oil and only earned Rs.100 a day. She then started working out in the gym and participated in local beauty contests. In 2002, she participated and won the Gladrags Mega Model Hunt. In 2004, Godse took part in the biggest modeling contest in India, the Femina Miss India contest. She reached the semi-finals and won the Miss Perfect Ten title. She then moved to Mumbai and started modeling.

Godse has to her credit the Airtel commercial where she shared screen space with Shah Rukh Khan and the Close-Up toothpaste commercial among the many she has done so far. She has spent over five years in the modelling field, doing press ads, music videos, commercials and walking the runway at national and international ramps. She appeared in the Hindi film Fashion. It was directed by Madhur Bhandarkar and has Priyanka Chopra, Kangana Ranaut and Arbaaz Khan alongside her. She received loads of praise for her performance — in her debut she has made a sensational mark.

She has also appeared in a commercial for Hollandia Yoghurt. She has been recently honored with Global Cinema Award of 8th Global Film Festival Noida by Sandeep Marwah of Asian Academy of Film & Television.

Film career
Godse made her Bollywood debut with the film Fashion (2008), alongside Priyanka Chopra and Kangana Ranaut. She was nominated for the Filmfare Award for Best Female Debut and won the Apsara Award for Best Female Debutante.

In 2009, Godse appeared in two films, All The Best, and Jail. Her film,  Help opposite Bobby Deol, was released on 13 August 2010. The film Gali Gali Chor Hai was released in February 2012 and Will You Marry Me? was released in March 2012. Godse and boyfriend Rahul Dev appeared in Power Couple reality show.

Personal life
Godse is in a relationship with actor Rahul Dev. She is an eggetarian.

Filmography

Film

Television

Web series

Music videos 
 Koka Tera Koka  (Jassi — T-Series)
 Mauja Len De (Daler Mehndi — T-series)
 Two Punjabi videos (T-series)
 Main Tujhse Milne Aayi Mandir Jaane Ke Bahane (Musicurry - Times Music)
 Le Kar Hum Deewana Dil (Times Music)
 Chhup Chhup Khade Ho  (Jagdish Mali — Times Music)
 Jab Chaye Mera Jadoo (with Irfan Pathan — Sony Music India)

Contests
 Participated and won the Gladrags Mega Model Contest in 2002. She also won the Miss Body Beautiful 2002 title in the same event.
 Participated in the Ponds Femina Miss India 2004 contest. Won the Miss Perfect 10 Title.
 Participated in Best Model of the World 2002. Won award for the Best National Costume as Miss India

Awards and nominations

References

External links
 
 

1982 births
Living people
Indian film actresses
Savitribai Phule Pune University alumni
Actresses from Pune
Actresses in Hindi cinema
21st-century Indian actresses
Fear Factor: Khatron Ke Khiladi participants